Vriesea lubbersii is a species of flowering plant in Bromeliaceae family. It is endemic to Brazil.

Cultivars
 Vriesea 'Africain'
 Vriesea 'Firecracker'
 Vriesea 'Plain Lubberly'

References

BSI Cultivar Registry Retrieved 11 October 2009

lubbersii
Flora of Brazil
Taxa named by John Gilbert Baker
Taxa named by Charles Jacques Édouard Morren
Taxa named by Carl Christian Mez